CGA may refer to:

Companies and organizations
 Canadian Gemmological Association
 Coast Guard Administration of Taiwan
 Controller General of Accounts of Pakistan
 Central of Georgia Railway, in 1833, a.k.a. Central Rail Road and Banking Company of Georgia
 Community of the Glorious Ascension, a Christian monastic community
 Compressed Gas Association
 Connecticut General Assembly, the bicameral legislative body of the American state of Connecticut
 United States Coast Guard Academy, the military academy of the US Coast Guard
 United States Coast Guard Auxiliary, a civilian branch of the US Coast Guard
 , the Education Workforce Council of Wales
 Casual Games Association, an industry group for casual video game developers and publishers
 Coordination of Anarchist Groups, a French anarchist organization

Computing
 Color Graphics Adapter, IBM's first graphics display card
 Computer animation, a.k.a. computer-generated animation
 Cryptographically Generated Address, a method for binding a public signature key to an IPv6 address

Science
 Chlorogenic acid, a polyphenolic compound
 Chorionic gonadotropin alpha, a glycoprotein hormone
 Chromogranin A, a member of the granin family of neuroendocrine secretory proteins
 A codon for the amino acid arginine

Other
 Canadian Global Almanac, Canadian reference book
 California's Great America, an amusement park in Santa Clara, California
 Certified General Accountant, Canadian designation
 Ceylon Garrison Artillery, a former name for the Sri Lanka Artillery
 Charitable gift annuity, a gift vehicle in the category of Planned Giving
 Column grid array, a type of integrated circuit package
 Composite Gazetteer of Antarctica, geographical directory
 Conformal geometric algebra
 Consumer Guarantees Act, a 1993 New Zealand law
 Corner Gas Animated, a 2018 TV series